The Motorcycle Diaries is the original soundtrack of the 2004 film of the same name starring Gael García Bernal. The score was composed by Gustavo Santaolalla. The album won the BAFTA Award for Best Film Music. On February 26, 2010 Norwegian electronica duo Röyksopp released a free-downloadable remix of "De Usuahia a la Quiaca" on their official website.

Track listing
Apertura 
Lagos Frías 
Chichina 
Chipi Chipi (Written by Gabriel Rodríguez) - María Ester Zamora, "Polito" González, Jorge Lobos, Cuti Aste, Roberto Lindl 
Montaña 
Sendero 
Procesión 
Jardín
La Partida 
La Muerte de la Poderosa 
Lima 
La Salida de Lima 
Zambita 
"Que Rico el Mambo" - Written and Performed by Dámaso Pérez Prado
Círculo en el Río 
Amazonas 
Cabalgando 
Leyendo en el Hospital 
El Cruce 
Partida del Leprosario 
De Usuahia a la Quiaca 
Revolución Caliente 
"Al otro lado del río" - Written and Performed by Jorge Drexler - won the Academy Award for Best Original Song.

References

2004 soundtrack albums
Biographical film soundtracks
Albums produced by Gustavo Santaolalla